Trent Wilson (born 18 November 1978) is an Australian former professional road cyclist. He rode in the 2004 and 2005 Giro d'Italia.

Major results
2000
 8th Overall Herald Sun Tour
2001
 9th Overall Herald Sun Tour
2002
 5th Overall Herald Sun Tour
2006
 1st Stage 3 Herald Sun Tour
2007
 6th Lancaster Classic
 7th U.S. Cycling Open

References

1978 births
Living people
Australian male cyclists
Cyclists from Sydney